The Church of All Saints is a Church of England parish church in Winkleigh, Devon. The church is a Grade I listed building.

History
The earliest part of the church dates to the early 14th century.  The church was remodelled in the 15th century.  Additions were made in the 17th and 19th centuries.  From 1871 to 1873, a major restoration was undertaken by J. F. Gould; it cost between £6000 and £7000, all of which (save £150 collected in the parish) was donated by George Henry Pinckard.  In 1902, the chancel was restored by George Fellowes Prynne, and an oak rood screen was inserted.

On 4 October 1960, the church was designated a grade I listed building.

Present day
Sunday Services are held at 9.30am and are either the Eucharist or Morning Prayer.

The parish of Winkleigh is part of the Winkleigh Mission Community, together with the parishes of Ashreigney, Broadwoodkelly and Brushford. It is in the Archdeaconry of Barnstaple of the Diocese of Exeter.

References

External links
 A Church Near You entry

Grade I listed churches in Devon
14th-century church buildings in England